Christian Steinhammer (born 21 October 1988) is an Austrian long-distance runner.

He won the silver medal in the men's 3000 metres steeplechase at the 2015 European Team Championships held in Baku, Azerbaijan. A year earlier, he won the bronze medal in this event.

In 2018, he competed in the men's half marathon at the IAAF World Half Marathon Championships held in Valencia, Spain. He finished in 89th place. In the same year, he also competed in the men's marathon at the 2018 European Athletics Championships held in Berlin, Germany. He finished in 41st place with a time of 2:20:40. In 2020, he competed in the men's race at the World Athletics Half Marathon Championships held in Gdynia, Poland.

References

External links 
 

Living people
1988 births
Place of birth missing (living people)
Austrian male long-distance runners
Austrian male marathon runners
Austrian male steeplechase runners
Athletes (track and field) at the 2015 European Games
European Games gold medalists for Austria
European Games medalists in athletics